The 1974 Piccadilly World Match Play Championship was the 11th World Match Play Championship. It was played from Thursday 10 to Saturday 12 October on the West Course at Wentworth. Eight players competed in a straight knock-out competition, with each match contested over 36 holes. The champion received £10,000 out of a total prize fund of £30,000. In the final, Hale Irwin beat defending champion Gary Player 3 & 1. It was Player's first defeat in a final after five previous victories.

Course
Source:

Scores
Source:

Prize money
The winner received £10,000, the runner-up £5,000, the losing semi-finalists £3,500 and the first round losers £2,000, making a total prize fund of £30,000.

References

Volvo World Match Play Championship
Golf tournaments in England
Piccadilly World Match Play Championship
Piccadilly World Match Play Championship
October 1974 sports events in the United Kingdom